Rineloricaria jaraguensis is a species of catfish in the family Loricariidae. It is native to South America, where it occurs in the Jaraguá River basin in the state of Santa Catarina in Brazil. The species reaches 18.5 cm (7.3 inches) in standard length and is believed to be a facultative air-breather.

References 

Loricariini
Catfish of South America
Freshwater fish of Brazil
Fish described in 1909
Taxa named by Franz Steindachner